Cook County is the most populous county in the U.S. state of Illinois and the second-most-populous county in the United States, after Los Angeles County, California. More than 40% of all residents of Illinois live within Cook County. As of 2020, the population was 5,275,541. Its county seat is Chicago, the most populous city in Illinois and the third most populous city in the United States.  The county is at center of the Chicagoland metropolitan area.

Cook County was incorporated in 1831 and named for Daniel Pope Cook, an early Illinois statesman. It achieved its present boundaries in 1839.  Within one hundred years, the county recorded explosive population growth going from a trading post village with a little over 600 residents to four million citizens, rivalling Paris by the Great Depression.  During the first half of the 20th century it had the absolute majority of Illinois's population.

There are more than 800 local governmental units and nearly 130 municipalities located wholly or partially within Cook County, the largest of which is Chicago. The city is home to approximately 54% of the entire county's population. The part of the county outside of the Chicago and Evanston city limits is divided into 29 townships; these often divide or share governmental services with local municipalities. Townships within Chicago were abolished in 1902 but are retained for real estate assessment purposes. Evanston Township was formerly coterminous with the City of Evanston but was abolished in 2014.  County government is overseen by the Cook County Board of Commissioners, and countywide state government offices include the Circuit Court of Cook County, the Cook County State's Attorney, the Cook County Sheriff, and the Cook County Assessor.

Geographically, the county is the sixth-largest in Illinois by land area and the largest by total area. It shares the state's Lake Michigan shoreline with Lake County. Land-use in Cook County is mostly urban and densely populated. Within Cook County, the State of Illinois took advantage of its Lake Michigan access and the Chicago Portage, beginning with the construction of the Illinois and Michigan Canal in 1848. This helped make the region a central transit hub for the nation. Chicago, with its location on the Great Lakes and via the St. Lawrence Seaway, is a global port city, giving Cook County an international shipping port.

Cook County's population is larger than that of 28 different U.S. states and territories, and larger than the population of 11 of the 13 Canadian provinces and territories. Cook County is included in the Chicago metropolitan Combined Statistical Area (CSA), which has a population of approximately 10 million people.

History
Cook County was created on January 15, 1831, out of Putnam County by an act of the Illinois General Assembly. It was the 54th county established in Illinois and was named after Daniel Cook, one of the earliest and youngest statesmen in Illinois history. He served as the second U.S. Representative from Illinois and the state's first Attorney General. In 1839, DuPage County was carved out of Cook County.

The shape of Cook County and the neighboring counties has remained the same since DuPage County was formed. The population in each county and the split of agriculture compared to residential and industrial activity has changed dramatically over the intervening decades to 2020. The county began with 10,201 people in the Census of 1840, growing rapidly to 5,150,233	people estimated for 2019 by the US Census. Growth was rapid in the 19th century, with the County reaching 2.4 million people by 1910. In the 20th century, the County reached 5.1 million population.

Cook County is nearly completely developed, with little agricultural land remaining near the outer county boundaries.

Demographics

According to the 2000 Census there were 1,974,181 households, out of which 30.9% had children under the age of 18 living with them, 44.0% were married couples living together, 15.6% had a female householder with no husband present, and 35.7% were non-families. 29.4% of all households were someone living alone including 9.3% who were 65 years of age or older. The average household size was 2.68 and the average family size was 3.38.

In the county, the population age distribution was: 26.0% under the age of 18, 9.9% from 18 to 24, 31.7% from 25 to 44, 20.7% from 45 to 64, and 11.7% who were 65 years of age or older.  The median age was 34 years.  For every 100 females, there were 93.9 males.  For every 100 females age 18 and over, there were 90.5 males.

The median income for a household in the county was $45,922, and the median income for a family was $53,784. Males had a median income of $40,690 versus $31,298 for females. The per capita income for the county was $23,227. About 10.6% of families and 13.5% of the population were below the poverty line, including 18.9% of those under age 18 and 10.3% of those age 65 or over.

As of the fourth quarter of 2021, the median home value in Cook County was $299,571, an increase of 11.7% from the prior year.

According to Census Bureau estimates, the county's population had decreased by 3.4% between the 2000 census and the 2010 census (5,194,675).  The county's population had grown slightly again by 2017 (5,211,263).

Ethnicity
{| class="wikitable floatright" style="text-align: center"
|+ Demographics (2010)
|-
! Demographic
! Proportion
|-
| White
|55.4%
|-
| Black
|24.8%
|-
| Asian
|6.2%
|-
| Islander
|0.0%
|-
| Native
|0.4%
|-
| Other
|13.1%
|-
| Hispanic(any race)
|24.0%
|}

As of the 2010 Census, the population of the county was 5,194,675, White Americans made up 55.4% of Cook County's population; non-Hispanic whites represented 43.9% of the population. African Americans made up 24.8% of the population. Native Americans made up 0.4% of Cook County's population. Asian Americans made up 6.2% of the population (1.8% Indian, 1.2% Filipino, 1.2% Chinese, 0.7% Korean, 0.3% Vietnamese, 0.2% Japanese, 0.8% Other). Pacific Islander Americans made up less than 0.1% of the population.  People from other races made up 10.6% of the population; people from two or more races made up 2.5% of the county's population. Hispanics and Latinos (of any race) made up 24.0% of Cook County's population.

As of the 2000 Census, there were 5,376,741 people, 1,974,181 households, and 1,269,398 families residing in the county. The racial makeup of the county was 56.27% white, 26.14% Black or African American, 0.29% Native American, 4.84% Asian, 0.05% Pacific Islanders, 9.88% from other races, and 2.53% from two or more races. 19.93% of the population were Hispanic or Latino of any race. 9.1% were of Polish, 8.1% German, 7.9% Irish and 5.7% Italian ancestry. 17.63% reported speaking Spanish at home; 3.13% speak Polish.

Whites (Hispanic and non-Hispanic) number roughly 2,793,500.  There are about 2,372,500 non-Hispanic whites residing in Cook County. Sizeable non-Hispanic white populations are those of German (11.4%), Irish (10.3%), Polish (9.7%), Italian (6.1%), and British (4.1%) descent. There are also significant groups of Swedish (1.5%), Russian (1.5%), French (1.3%), Greek (1.2%), Czech (1.0%), Dutch (1.0%), Lithuanian (0.9%), and Norwegian (0.8%) descent.

Black Americans are the second largest racial group. Black Americans form over one-quarter (25.4%) of Cook County's population. Blacks of non-Hispanic origin form 25.2% of the population; black Hispanics make up the remaining 0.2% of the populace. There are roughly 1,341,000 African Americans of both Hispanic and non-Hispanic origin living in Cook County; 1,328,000 are non-Hispanic blacks. Roughly 52,500 people were of Sub-Saharan African ancestry, making up 1.0% of the total population.

Approximately 10,300 residents of Cook County are of Native American ancestry. They consist of Cherokee, Chippewa, Navajo, and Sioux. Native Americans of Hispanic origin represent a sizeable portion of the Native American population. Nearly 6,000 Native Americans are of non-Hispanic origin, and some 4,300 are of Hispanic origin. Over 40% of the Native American racial group is of Hispanic descent.

Asian Americans are a very sizeable racial group in the county, numbering about 301,000. The Asian population is ethnically diverse, and includes roughly 87,900 Indians, 61,700 Filipinos, 60,700 Chinese, 35,000 Koreans, 13,700 Vietnamese, and 11,100 Japanese. Roughly 30,800 are of other Asian ethnic groups, such as Thai, Cambodian, and Hmong.

Approximately 3,000 residents are of Pacific Islander heritage. This group includes roughly Native Hawaiians, Guamanians, Samoans, and various people of other Pacific Islander groups.

Hispanic and Latino Americans make up over one-fifth (22.8%) of Cook County's population. Roughly 1,204,000 Latinos live in the county. Mexicans are the most common Latino group. Cook County's 925,000 Mexican Americans make up 17.5% of its population. Roughly 127,000 Puerto Ricans live in the county, while over 12,200 Cubans reside in the county. There are some 140,000 Hispanics and Latinos of other nationalities living in Cook County (i.e. Colombian, Bolivian, etc.), and they collectively make up 2.6% of the county's population.American FactFinder 

Religion
In 2010 statistics, the largest religious group in Cook County was the Archdiocese of Chicago, with 1,947,223 Catholics worshipping at 371 parishes, followed by 209,195 non-denominational adherents with 486 congregations, an estimated 201,152 Muslims with 62 congregations, 68,865 NBC Baptists with 99 congregations, 49,925 ELCA Lutherans with 145 congregations, 49,909 SBC Baptists with 181 congregations, 45,979 LCMS Lutherans with 120 congregations, 39,866 UCC Christians with 101 congregations, 33,584 UMC Methodists with 121 congregations, and 32,646 AG Pentecostals with 64 congregations. Altogether, 59.6% of the population was claimed as members by religious congregations, although members of historically African-American denominations were underrepresented due to incomplete information. In 2014, Cook County had 2,001 religious organizations, second only to Los Angeles County out of all US counties.

Geography

It is the sixth largest county in Illinois by land area, and the largest in total area. Most of the water is in Lake Michigan.

Climate and weather

Cook County is among the few counties in the United States to border two counties with the same name (Lake County, Illinois and Lake County, Indiana). Illinois has two such counties (Randolph County borders both Perry County, Illinois and Perry County, Missouri).

National protected areas
 Chicago Portage National Historic Site
 Pullman National Monument

Government and politics

Government

The government of Cook County is primarily composed of the Board of Commissioners headed by the President of the County board, other elected officials such as the Sheriff, State's Attorney, Treasurer, Board of Review, Clerk, Assessor, Recorder, Circuit Court judges, and Circuit Court Clerk, as well as numerous other officers and entities. Cook County is the only home rule county in Illinois. The Cook County Code is the codification of Cook County's local ordinances. Cook County's current County Board president is Toni Preckwinkle.

The Circuit Court of Cook County, which is an Illinois state court of general jurisdiction is funded, in part, by Cook County, and accepts more than 1.2 million cases each year for filing. The Cook County Department of Corrections, also known as the Cook County Jail, is the largest single-site jail in the nation. The Cook County Juvenile Detention Center, under the authority of the Chief Judge of the court, is the first juvenile center in the nation and one of the largest in the nation. The Cook County Law Library is the second-largest county law library in the nation.

The Bureau of Health Services administers the county's public health services and is the third-largest public health system in the nation. Three hospitals are part of this system: John H. Stroger, Jr. Hospital of Cook County, Provident Hospital, and Oak Forest Hospital of Cook County, along with over 30 clinics.

The Cook County Department of Transportation is responsible for the design and maintenance of roadways in the county. These thoroughfares are composed mostly of major and minor arterials, with a few local roads. Although the County Department of Transportation was instrumental in designing many of the expressways in the county, today they are under the jurisdiction of the state.

The Cook County Forest Preserves, organized in 1915, is a separate, independent taxing body, but the Cook County Board of Commissioners also acts as its Board of Commissioners. The Brookfield Zoo (managed by the Chicago Zoological Society) and the Chicago Botanic Garden (managed by the Chicago Horticultural Society) are located in the forest preserves.

Cook County is the fifth-largest employer in Chicago.

In March 2008, the County Board increased the sales tax by one percent to 1.75 percent. This followed a quarter-cent increase in mass transit taxes. In Chicago, the rate increased to 10.25 percent, the steepest nominal rate of any major metropolitan area in America. In Evanston, sales tax reached 10 percent and Oak Lawn residents pay 9.5 percent. On July 22, 2008, the Cook County board voted against Cook County Commissioner's proposal to repeal the tax increase.

In 2016, Cook County joined Chicago in adopting a $13 hourly minimum wage. Cook County Board chairman John Daley called the wage hike "the moral and right thing to do." In June 2017, however, nearly 75 home rule municipalities passed measures opting themselves out of the increase.

Politics
The county has more Democratic Party members than any other Illinois county and it is one of the most Democratic counties in the United States. Since 1932, the majority of its voters have only supported a Republican candidate in a Presidential election three times, all during national Republican landslides–Dwight Eisenhower over native son Adlai Stevenson II in 1952 and 1956, and Richard Nixon over George McGovern in 1972. Since then, the closest a Republican has come to carrying the county was in 1984, when Ronald Reagan won 48.4 percent of the county's vote. In 2020, 74 percent of the county voted for Joe Biden and 24 percent voted for Donald Trump.

In 1936, with Franklin D. Roosevelt receiving 1,253,164 votes in the county, Cook County became the first county in American history where a candidate received one million votes.

The Cook County Democratic Party represents Democratic voters in 50 wards in the city of Chicago and 30 suburban townships of Cook County. The organization has dominated County, city, and state politics since the 1930s. The last Republican mayor of Chicago was William Hale "Big Bill" Thompson, who left office in 1931 with a record of corruption. The most successful Republican candidate for mayor since then was Bernard Epton, who in 1983 came within 3.3 percentage points of defeating Democrat Harold Washington. The county's Republican Party organization is the Cook County Republican Party.

The last Republican governor to carry the county was Jim Edgar in his 1994 landslide. The last Republican senator to do so was Charles H. Percy in 1978.

Secession movements
To establish more localized government control and policies which reflect the often different values and needs of large suburban sections of the sprawling county, secession movements have been made over the years which called for certain townships or municipalities to form their own independent counties.

In the late 1970s, a movement started which proposed a separation of six northwest suburban townships, Cook County's panhandle (Barrington, Hanover, Palatine, Wheeling, Schaumburg, and Elk Grove) from Cook to form Lincoln County, in honor of the former U.S. president and Illinois resident. It is likely that Arlington Heights would have been the county seat. This northwest suburban region of Cook was at the time moderately conservative and has a population over 500,000. Local legislators, led by State Senator Dave Regnar, went so far as to propose it as official legislation in the Illinois House. The legislation died, however, before coming to a vote.

In 2004, Blue Island Mayor Donald E. Peloquin organized a coalition of fifty-five south and southwest suburban municipalities to form a new county, also proposing the name Lincoln County. The county would include everything south of Burbank, stretching as far west as Orland Park, as far east as Calumet City, and as far south as Matteson, covering an expansive area with a population of over one million residents. Peloquin argued that the south suburbs are often shunned by the city (although Chicago is not bound or required to do anything for other municipalities) and he blamed the Chicago-centric policies of Cook County for failing to jumpstart the somewhat-depressed south suburban local economy. Pending sufficient interest from local communities, Peloquin planned a petition drive to place a question regarding the secession on the general election ballot, but the idea was not met with success.

In arguing against the Lincoln County proposal, others noted several of the cities involved had power structures, law enforcement, or de facto "mayors for life" often accused in the press, or civilly or criminally charged with, political corruption, cronyism, and nepotism, and themselves being the main factor in their depressed economies rather than anyone in Cook County government. The opposition decried that their true reason for joining the secession effort was to start with a 'clean slate' with a new county government by design less willing to enforce responsibility against their abuses of power.

Talk of secession from Cook County amongst some outlying communities again heated up in mid-2008 in response to a highly controversial 1% sales tax hike which has pushed the tax rates across the county communities up amongst the highest in the nation. Some border towns in particular had been outraged, as people can take their business across the county border (paying, for instance, 7% in Lake County instead of Palatine's 9.5%). The secession issue eventually died down from the nominal tax increase.

In 2011, two downstate Republican state representatives, Bill Mitchell of the 87th district and Adam Brown of the 101st district, proposed statehood for Cook County. Mitchell said that Chicago is "dictating its views" to the rest of the state and Brown added that Chicago "overshadows" the rest of Illinois.

Infrastructure
Canals
Construction of the Erie Canal in New York State made a connection from the Atlantic Ocean to the Great Lakes in 1821. As the Midwest farms proved productive, with much grain to sell to other parts of the US, Chicago and Cook County saw the benefit of a canal to improve the link from the Great Lakes to the Mississippi River. The Illinois and Michigan Canal was completed in 1848, extending from the Bridgeport neighborhood in Chicago on the Chicago River, to the Illinois River at the cities of LaSalle-Peru. This canal spurred the growth of Chicago and the areas around it, as water travel was the primary way to ship grain or other commodities in that part of the 19th century. The Illinois and Michigan Canal ceased major operation in 1933. Portions are now designated as a National Historic Corridor. The two canals and the Great Lakes cemented trade ties between the Midwest and the Northeast, encouraging farmers to grow more than they needed to feed themselves in Illinois, with a large market for grain now open to them. Towns in Cook County along the Canal grew. From a national perspective, the trade ties made the South region of the US less important to the Northeast as a trade partner.

The Chicago Sanitary and Ship Canal, completed in 1900, largely replaced the functions of the Illinois and Michigan Canal. This canal resulted in the reversal of the direction of flow of the main stem and the South branch of the Chicago River; they used to empty into Lake Michigan and now those river sections flow toward the Des Plaines River. The Sanitary and Ship Canal was built to serve many aims, including ending using Lake Michigan as a sewer, sending waste water through treatment plants and sending it away from Lake Michigan. It is also a waterway for movement of ships.

Railway network
The next major technology for transportation was railroads. Chicago and the towns along the canal and rivers understood the value of being a hub of a major network. Rail lines spurred out from Chicago by the 1850s, with major growth in the rail network for freight and passenger transportation coming after the Civil War (U.S.), when the transcontinental railroads were completed, coast to coast across the US, stopping in Chicago, the heart of Cook County.

Major highways
Following on the well-established position of Chicago as a transportation hub, the Interstate highway network maintained Chicago as a hub of that network, as well as serving the travel needs within the region.Interstate Highways 
 
 
 
 
 
 
 
 
 US Highways 
 
 
 
 
 
 
 
 Illinois Highways'''
  Illinois Route 1
  Illinois Route 7
  Illinois Route 19
  Illinois Route 21
  Illinois Route 25
  Illinois Route 38
  Illinois Route 43
  Illinois Route 50
  Illinois Route 53
  Illinois Route 56
  Illinois Route 58
  Illinois Route 59
  Illinois Route 62
  Illinois Route 64
  Illinois Route 68
  Illinois Route 72
  Illinois Route 83
  Illinois Route 110
  Illinois Route 171
  Illinois Route 390
  Illinois Route 394

Airports
When the age of air travel began in the 20th century, Midway Airport was built on one square mile of land and served as the major Chicago area airport from 1927 to 1955. Midway International Airport has been enlarged and continues to operate as of 2020. As air travel became more important for passenger travel, and then for select freight commodities, O'Hare International Airport was built adjacent to a military airfield in the northwest part of Cook County. The City of Chicago annexed the land for the airport, so that the city controls both airports serving a large area. During the second half of the 20th century, it was the world's busiest airport. The approach of Cook County and Chicago to air travel has been the same as the approach to canal, railroad and highway transportation, to serve as a major national hub.

There has been a long running plan for a third major airport to serve the south side of the city and the southern and southwestern suburbs, the Proposed Chicago south suburban airport intended for Peotone, Illinois. The state of Illinois has been addressing this topic since 1986. Some land has been acquired, but there is not a functioning airport there, as of August 2020.

Communities

Cities

 Berwyn
 Blue Island
 Burbank
 Calumet City
 Chicago (county seat and largest municipality)
 Chicago Heights
 Country Club Hills
 Countryside
 Des Plaines
 Elgin (part)
 Elmhurst (part)
 Evanston
 Harvey
 Hickory Hills
 Hometown
 Markham
 Northlake
 Oak Forest
 Orland Park
 Palos Heights
 Palos Hills
 Palos Park
 Park Ridge
 Prospect Heights
 Rolling Meadows

Towns
 Cicero

Villages

 Alsip
 Arlington Heights
 Barrington (partly in Lake County)
 Barrington Hills (mostly)
 Bartlett (mostly in DuPage County)
 Bedford Park
 Bellwood
 Bensenville (mostly in DuPage County)
 Berkeley
 Bridgeview
 Broadview
 Brookfield
 Buffalo Grove (mostly in Lake County)
 Burnham
 Burr Ridge (mostly in DuPage County)
 Calumet Park
 Chicago Ridge
 Crestwood
 Deer Park (mostly in Lake County)
 Deerfield (mostly in Lake County)
 Dixmoor
 Dolton
 East Dundee (mostly in Kane County)
 East Hazel Crest
 Elk Grove Village (partly in DuPage County)
 Elmwood Park
 Evergreen Park
 Flossmoor
 Ford Heights
 Forest Park
 Forest View
 Frankfort (mostly in Will County)
 Franklin Park
 Glencoe
 Glenview
 Glenwood
 Golf
 Hanover Park (mostly in DuPage County)
 Harwood Heights
 Hazel Crest
 Hillside
 Hinsdale (mostly in DuPage County)
 Hodgkins
 Hoffman Estates (partly in Kane County)
 Homewood
 Indian Head Park
 Inverness
 Justice
 Kenilworth
 La Grange
 La Grange Park
 Lansing
 Lemont (partly in DuPage County and Will County)
 Lincolnwood
 Lynwood
 Lyons
 Matteson
 Maywood
 McCook
 Melrose Park
 Merrionette Park
 Midlothian
 Morton Grove
 Mount Prospect
 Niles
 Norridge
 North Riverside
 Northbrook
 Northfield
 Oak Brook (mostly in DuPage County)
 Oak Forest
 Oak Lawn
 Oak Park
 Olympia Fields
 Orland Hills
 Orland Park (partly in Will County)
 Palatine
 Palos Park
 Park Forest (partly in Will County)
 Phoenix
 Posen
 Richton Park
 River Forest
 River Grove
 Riverdale
 Riverside
 Robbins
 Roselle (mostly in DuPage County)
 Rosemont
 Sauk Village (partly in Will County)
 Schaumburg (partly in DuPage County)
 Schiller Park
 Skokie
 South Barrington
 South Chicago Heights
 South Holland
 Steger (partly in Will County)
 Stickney
 Stone Park
 Streamwood
 Summit
 Thornton
 Tinley Park (partly in Will County)
 University Park (mostly in Will County)
 Westchester
 Western Springs
 Wheeling
 Willow Springs (small portion in DuPage County)
 Wilmette
 Winnetka
 Woodridge (mostly in DuPage County and Will County
 Worth

Unincorporated communities

 Central Stickney
 Hines
 Indian Hill
 La Grange Highlands
 Nottingham Park
 Sag Bridge
 Sutton

Other Communities
 Orchard Place
 Techny

Historic Site
 Fort Dearborn

Townships
The county is divided into 29 townships, in addition to the cities of Chicago and Evanston.

Current townships & Independent cities
The 29 townships and 2 independent cities of Cook County, with their populations as of the 2010 Census, are:

 City of Chicago - 2,695,598
 City of Evanston - 74,486
 Barrington Township – 15,636
 Berwyn Township – 56,657
 Bloom Township – 90,922
 Bremen Township – 110,118
 Calumet Township – 20,777
 Cicero Township – 83,891
 Elk Grove Township – 92,905
 Hanover Township – 99,538
 Lemont Township – 21,113
 Leyden Township – 92,890
 Lyons Township – 111,688
 Maine Township – 135,772
 New Trier Township – 55,424
 Niles Township – 105,882
 Northfield Township – 85,102
 Norwood Park Township – 26,385
 Oak Park Township – 51,878
 Orland Township – 97,558
 Palatine Township – 112,994
 Palos Township – 54,615
 Proviso Township – 151,704
 Rich Township – 76,727
 River Forest Township – 11,172
 Riverside Township – 15,594
 Schaumburg Township – 131,288
 Stickney Township – 40,772
 Thornton Township – 169,326
 Wheeling Township – 153,630
 Worth Township – 152,633

Former townships
Chicago's eight former townships and annexed parts of others no longer have any governmental structure or responsibility since their annexations, but their names and boundaries are still used on property plats and by Cook County for tax assessment purposes. In 2014, Evanston Township was dissolved by voters and its functions were absorbed by the city of Evanston.

 Evanston Township
 Jefferson Township
 Hyde Park Township
 Lake Township
 Lake View Township
 North Township
 Rogers Park Township
 South Township
 West Township

Adjacent counties

 McHenry County, Illinois – northwest
 Lake County, Illinois – north
 Berrien County, Michigan – east
 Lake County, Indiana – southeast
 Will County, Illinois – south
 DuPage County, Illinois – west
 Kane County, Illinois – west

Cook County is one of three U.S. counties (the others being Wayne County, West Virginia and Apache County, Arizona) to border two counties of the same name, neither of which is in the same state as the county itself (Lake County, Illinois and Lake County, Indiana).

Education

Public school districts

Colleges and universities
 Chicago State University
 City Colleges of Chicago
 Columbia College Chicago
 Depaul University
 Illinois Institute of Technology
 Loyola University Chicago
 National Louis University
 Northeastern Illinois University
 Northwestern University
 Roosevelt University
 School of the Art Institute of Chicago
 University of Chicago
 University of Illinois Chicago

See also

 Chicago metropolitan area
 Cook County Forest Preserve District
 Metropolitan Water Reclamation District of Greater Chicago
 National Register of Historic Places listings in Cook County, Illinois

References

External links

 Cook County Government Website

 
Illinois counties
1831 establishments in Illinois
Populated places established in 1831
Cook County
Majority-minority counties in the United States